The UEFA Amateur Cup was a football competition for amateur teams in Europe.

All tournaments

External links
All Tournaments
History

Amateur Cup
Amateur association football
Defunct international association football competitions in Europe